Rossville is a town in Ross Township, Clinton County, Indiana, United States. The population was 1,653 at the 2010 census.

History
In 1834, Ewing and Thomas Smith platted the town of Rossville with the intention of starting a blacksmith shop at the location. The town grew steadily and gained a store operated by William Seawright, a saddler (John H. Smith) and a physician (Dr. James Wilson). Residents of Rossville are also referred to as "Rossvillians".

A petition to incorporate the town was filed on October 22, 1870, at which time the town had 339 residents and 66 families. The incorporation election, held November 5, passed with a vote of 35 to 19 and on December 1, 1870, Rossville was incorporated. The town is named for John Ross, a pioneer settler and associate county judge.

The Monon Railroad was completed through Rossville in 1883.

Geography
Rossville is located at  (40.419138, -86.596466).

Demographics

2010 census
As of the census of 2010, there were 1,653 people, 611 households, and 451 families living in the town. The racial makeup of the town was 97.5% White, 0.4% African American, 0.2% Native American, 0.5% Asian, 0.6% from other races, and 0.8% from two or more races. Hispanic or Latino of any race were 0.8% of the population.

There were 611 households, of which 37.3% had children under the age of 18 living with them, 54.5% were married couples living together, 14.6% had a female householder with no husband present, 4.7% had a male householder with no wife present, and 26.2% were non-families. 22.6% of all households were made up of individuals, and 11.4% had someone living alone who was 65 years of age or older. The average household size was 2.56 and the average family size was 2.99.

The median age in the town was 39.6 years. 26% of residents were under the age of 18; 7.7% were between the ages of 18 and 24; 23.4% were from 25 to 44; 23.8% were from 45 to 64; and 18.9% were 65 years of age or older. The gender makeup of the town was 45.5% male and 54.5% female.

2000 census

As of the census of 2000, there were 1,513 people, 555 households, and 411 families living in the town. The racial makeup of the town was 98.88% White, 0.53% African American, 0.13% Asian, 0.07% from other races, and 0.40% from two or more races. Hispanic or Latino of any race were 0.33% of the population.

There were 555 households, out of which 38.7% had children under the age of 18 living with them, 64.3% were married couples living together, 7.2% had a female householder with no husband present, and 25.8% were non-families. 22.5% of all households were made up of individuals, and 9.9% had someone living alone who was 65 years of age or older. The average household size was 2.58 and the average family size was 3.04.

In the town, the population was spread out, with 27.8% under the age of 18, 5.9% from 18 to 24, 31.9% from 25 to 44, 16.7% from 45 to 64, and 17.7% who were 65 years of age or older. The median age was 36 years. For every 100 females, there were 80.3 males. For every 100 females age 18 and over, there were 81.7 males.

The median income for a household in the town was $48,333, and the median income for a family was $50,694. Males had a median income of $45,000 versus $23,819 for females. The per capita income for the town was $19,765. About 2.3% of families and 3.7% of the population were below the poverty line, including 2.8% of those under age 18 and 8.7% of those age 65 or over.

Arts and culture

Annual cultural events
An annual festival marks the end of summer in Rossville. The event has been held annually since 1984. The festival is held on the fourth full weekend in August, and includes a car show, fireworks, music, performances on the main stage, street fair, parade, programs in the high school auditorium, queen, little miss and mister contest, and town-wide garage sales. The festival concludes with a community-wide worship service.

References

External links
 
 Town of Rossville, Indiana website
 ePodunk: Profile for Rossville, Indiana, IN
 City-Data.com

Towns in Clinton County, Indiana
Towns in Indiana
Populated places established in 1832
Festivals in Indiana
1832 establishments in Indiana